Anthony Calvillo (born August 23, 1972) is the quarterbacks coach for the Montreal Alouettes of the Canadian Football League (CFL)  and is a former professional Canadian football quarterback. He was professional football's all-time passing yards leader from 2011 to 2020, and is first in all-time CFL passing yards. In his career, he passed for 79,816 yards and is one of nine professional quarterbacks to have completed over 400 touchdown passes (the others being Brett Favre, Warren Moon, Peyton Manning, Dan Marino, Tom Brady, Drew Brees, Philip Rivers and Aaron Rodgers). His reign ended in 2020 when Brees surpassed him.

Calvillo won three Grey Cup championships in 2002, 2009, and 2010, and named Grey Cup Most Valuable Player in 2002. He also won the CFL's Most Outstanding Player Award three times, in 2003, 2008, and 2009, which ties him for second all-time behind Doug Flutie. Calvillo announced his retirement on January 21, 2014. Calvillo was an assistant coach for the Alouettes from 2015 to 2017 and with the Toronto Argonauts in 2018.

Early life, high school career, and family
Calvillo was born in Los Angeles, California. While attending La Puente High School, he was a two-sport standout in football and basketball. He is of Mexican-American descent. Calvillo grew up with an alcoholic and abusive father; sports were his escape from his turbulent childhood.

College career
Calvillo spent two seasons at Mt. San Antonio College before transferring to Utah State University in 1992. After a solid junior year as starting quarterback, he had a terrific senior season in 1993. He set a school record with 3,260 yards of total offense in the regular season, and he also set a school record with five touchdown passes in a single game (he did it twice). With Calvillo leading the offense, USU won the Big West Conference championship for the first time since 1979. The Aggies finished the year with a 42–33 win over Ball State in the Las Vegas Bowl; Calvillo passed for 386 yards and three touchdowns to win MVP honors. It was Utah State's first-ever bowl victory.

College career statistics

Professional career

Las Vegas Posse
After not being drafted by an NFL team, Calvillo started his Canadian Football League career in 1994 with the US expansion Las Vegas Posse.

Hamilton Tiger-Cats
After the Posse folded a year later in the CFL U.S. expansion experiment, Calvillo was selected first overall by the Hamilton Tiger-Cats in the dispersal draft. While in Hamilton, Calvillo served as a backup quarterback to players such as Steve Taylor and Matt Dunigan.

Montreal Alouettes
In 1998, Calvillo signed as a free agent with the Montreal Alouettes, where he became one of the most outstanding quarterbacks in history. He led the Alouettes to the 2002 Grey Cup, their first in 25 years, where he was named the most valuable player in the game.

During the 2003 CFL season, Calvillo broke numerous Montreal Alouette passing records, completing 408 of 675 passing attempts for 5,891 yards and 37 touchdowns. In 2004, with 6,041 passing yards, Calvillo became the fourth quarterback in CFL history to pass for more than 6,000 yards in a single season (Doug Flutie, David Archer, and Kent Austin being the other three), earning him the East Division nomination for Most Outstanding Player for the third consecutive year. With Calvillo quarterbacking the Alouettes' offence, the 2004 Alouettes became the first team in CFL history to have four players with over 1,000 yards receiving in the same season: Ben Cahoon (1183 yards), Jeremaine Copeland (1154 yards), Thyron Anderson (1147 yards), and Kwame Cavil (1090 yards). In 2005, Calvillo and the Alouettes repeated the feat of four receivers over 1,000 yards: Kerry Watkins (1364 yards), Terry Vaughn (1113 yards), Ben Cahoon (1067 yards), and Dave Stala (1037 yards).

The 2008 CFL season saw Calvillo hit a number of career milestones. On June 26, in a game against the Hamilton Tiger-Cats, Calvillo surpassed Danny McManus to become the second-all-time leading passer in the CFL. On July 31, in another game against the Hamilton Tiger-Cats, Calvillo became the fourth quarterback in league history to reach 300 career touchdown passes. On August 15, 2008, in a game against the Toronto Argonauts, Calvillo became the second quarterback in CFL history after Damon Allen to reach 4,000 career pass completions. With 5,633 passing yards and 43 touchdown passes, Calvillo won the 2008 Most Outstanding Player award. Calvillo led the Montreal Alouettes to the 2008 Grey Cup final, which the Alouettes lost 22–14 to the Calgary Stampeders.

In 2009, Calvillo added to his club records while reaching more CFL milestones. On July 23, 2009, he surpassed Canadian Football Hall of Famer Ron Lancaster's 334 career touchdown passes to move into second place all time.  He sat out two games during the regular season, but still accumulated 4639 yards while posting a remarkable 72.0% completion rate, the second best single-season completion rate in CFL history behind Dave Dickenson's 73.98% mark set in 2005. Calvillo led Montreal to a 16-point fourth quarter comeback victory in the 97th Grey Cup on Nov. 29, when the Alouettes defeated the Saskatchewan Roughriders 28–27 on a last-second field goal known as the "13th Man" finish.

Calvillo won his third Grey Cup on November 28, 2010, at 98th Grey Cup in Edmonton, Alberta where he defeated the Saskatchewan Roughriders 21-18 for the second year in a row. He added to his record total of passing yards in Grey Cup games with 2470 yards, as well as setting the record for Grey Cup starts with eight. As of the 2010 CFL season, Calvillo is 3–5 in Grey Cup Championship Games.

In a post-game interview, he revealed that he would be undergoing off-season surgery to remove a lesion on his thyroid that was discovered after he injured his sternum during the season. On December 21, 2010, it was reported that Calvillo had successful thyroidectomy surgery to remove a cancerous lesion.

On July 15, 2011, in a game against the Toronto Argonauts, Calvillo completed his CFL record 395th career touchdown pass to Éric Deslauriers. On August 4 of that same season, and again against the Argonauts, Calvillo completed his 5159th pass completion to Brandon London to move past Damon Allen to become the leader in that category as well. Then, on October 10, 2011, Calvillo completed a touchdown pass to Jamel Richardson to become professional football's all-time leading passer, in the Alouettes' third and final game against the Toronto Argonauts that year. In 2012, Calvillo became the only player in football history to pass 5,000 yards seven times in his career. He reached 4,000 yards passing eleven times in his career (a CFL record); only Peyton Manning of the NFL has reached the 4,000 mark more times in his career with fourteen 4,000 yard seasons. He also set another CFL record having 8 consecutive 300+ passing yards games in a single season, breaking the record he shared with Doug Flutie.

Calvillo signed a two-year contract on December 13, 2012, with the deal keeping him with the Als through the 2014 season. In Week 8 of the 2013 CFL season, Calvillo left the game after taking a hit from Saskatchewan's Ricky Foley. Three days after the game, it was announced that he had suffered a concussion, and missed the Week 9 game against the BC Lions and the Week 10 game against the Toronto Argonauts. On September 4, 2013, the Als placed Calvillo on the 9-game injury list. On October 18, 2013, the Montreal Alouettes general manager and head coach Jim Popp announced that Calvillo would not be returning to play for the remainder of the 2013 season.

On January 21, 2014, Calvillo announced his retirement from professional football. Before his retirement, he was offered the offensive coordinator position with the Alouettes but declined. On October 13, 2014, Calvillo's jersey number, #13, was retired in a halftime ceremony at McGill Stadium. Upon his retirement, he was the last active player that played for an American-based CFL team during its expansion to the US in the mid-1990s.

Career statistics

Coaching career

Montreal Alouettes 
On December 15, 2014, the Montreal Alouettes announced that Calvillo would be joining the team as an offensive coach in 2015. On January 29, 2015, Calvillo was appointed as the receivers coach. After the firing of Alouettes head coach Tom Higgins, Calvillo was named the quarterbacks coach for the Alouettes on August 22, 2015. After a few weeks, the team's offensive coordinator, Turk Schonert, was fired and Calvillo was named co-offensive coordinator along with Ryan Dinwiddie. Going into the 2016 season, Calvillo was named offensive coordinator with Jacques Chapdelaine as his special advisor as he grew into the role. After head coach Jim Popp resigned and Chapdelaine was promoted to that position, Chapdelaine also took over play-calling duties from Calvillo. For the 2017 season, Calvillo was announced as the quarterbacks coach.

Toronto Argonauts 
On March 19, 2018, the Argos announced the hiring of Calvillo as their quarterback coach. The hire reunited Calvillo with his former general manager Jim Popp, and head coach Marc Trestman.

Montreal Carabins 
On December 19, 2018, Calvillo was named as the assistant head coach for the Montreal Carabins football team in U Sports. The move reunited Calvillo with Danny Maciocia, who was an offensive coach with the Alouettes from 1996 to 2001. He was promoted to offensive coordinator and quarterbacks coach and served in that capacity for the 2021 U Sports football season.

Montreal Alouettes (II)
On January 6, 2022, it was announced that Calvillo had re-joined the Alouettes' coaching staff as the team's quarterbacks coach. In early December 2022 it was reported that Calvillo was one of five finalists for the vacant Alouettes head coaching job.

Honors
2011 Pro Football record all-time leader in passing yards
2002, 2009, 2010 Grey Cup Champion
2003, 2008, 2009 CFL Most Outstanding Player
2002, 2003, 2004, 2008, 2009, 2010, 2011 East Division Most Outstanding Player
2002 Grey Cup Most Valuable Player
2002, 2003, 2008, 2009 CFL All-Star team
2000, 2002, 2003, 2004, 2006, 2008, 2009, 2010, 2011 CFL East Division All-Star team
2002, 2003, 2008, 2010 CFLPA All-Star team
2004 CFLPA East Division All-Star team
2004 Fans' Choice Award

In 2012 in honour of the 100th Grey Cup, Canada Post used his image on a series of commemorative postage stamps. The image was also used on presentation posters and other materials to promote the Grey Cup game and other celebrations associated with the centennial.

On October 13, 2014, the Alouettes organization retired Calvillo's number 13 in a half-time ceremony.

He was inducted into the Canadian Football Hall of Fame in 2017.

Personal life
Calvillo and his wife Alexia have two daughters and reside year-round in Montreal, Quebec. Calvillo became a Canadian citizen on November 19, 2021.

References

External links

Montreal Carabins bio
Anthony Calvillo, Greatest QB You Have Never Seen
Anthony Calvillo of the C.F.L. is Pro Football's Top Passer
An unlikely pass master

1972 births
Living people
American emigrants to Canada
American football quarterbacks
American players of Canadian football
Canadian Football League Most Outstanding Player Award winners
Canadian football quarterbacks
Hamilton Tiger-Cats players
Las Vegas Posse players
Montreal Alouettes players
Montreal Alouettes coaches
Players of American football from Los Angeles
Utah State Aggies football players
Canadian Football Hall of Fame inductees
Toronto Argonauts coaches
People from La Puente, California
Players of Canadian football from Los Angeles